Evergreen is the sixth studio album by American progressive metal band After the Burial. The album was released on April 19, 2019 through Sumerian Records and is the band's first release with the bassist Adrian Oropeza.

Release
The release of Evergreen was announced on February 26, 2019, when the cover art and track listing was unveiled. The first single "Behold the Crown" was released that same day. "Exit, Exist" was the second song released off Evergreen, it premiered on April 2, 2019.

Track listing

Personnel
Credits retrieved from AllMusic.

After the Burial
 Anthony Notarmaso – lead vocals
 Trent Hafdahl – guitars, programming, backing vocals, production
 Adrian Oropeza  – bass
 Dan Carle – drums

Additional personnel
 Will Putney – engineering, mastering, mixing, production
 Steve Seid – engineering
 Matt Guglielmo – assisting
 Ash Avildsen and Nick Walters – A&R
 Daniel McBride – artwork, layout

Charts

References

2019 albums
After the Burial albums
Sumerian Records albums
Albums produced by Will Putney